Tuğrul can refer to:

 Tuğrul, Mut, a village in Mut district of Mersin Province, Turkey
 Tuğrul, Yığılca, a village in the Yığılca District of Düzce Province in Turkey
 Tughril (990-1063), Turkoman founder of the Seljuk Empire
 Toghril (1130-1203), a khan of Keraites

See also
 Turul, a mythological bird of prey in Hungarian tradition